Pierre Mercier may refer to:

 Pierre Mercier (footballer) (born 1982), Haitian international footballer
 Pierre Mercier (politician) (1937-2020), Canadian politician